Henry Salmon JP (1881–1950), was a British businessman, the chairman from 1941 to 1950 of J. Lyons and Co.

Early life
Harry Salmon was a younger son of Barnett Salmon (1829–1897) who co-founded Salmon & Gluckstein and J. Lyons and Co.

Career
Salmon was a director of J. Lyons and Co. by 1935, and chairman from 1941 to 1950, when he was succeeded by Major Montague Isidore Gluckstein OBE.

Personal life
Salmon married Lena Gluckstein, the daughter of Isidore Gluckstein and his wife Rose Cohen, and they had children:
 Geoffrey Isidore Hamilton Salmon (1908–1990)
 Alfred Harry Barnett Salmon
 Ruth Margaret Salmon

References

1881 births
1950 deaths
20th-century British businesspeople
British Jews
Harry